Rangsiman Rome is a Thai politician and activist. He currently serves as a member of Thailand's House of Representatives and the Move Forward Party's deputy secretary-general.

Early life and education 
Rangsiman was born on May 31, 1992, in Phuket, Thailand. He graduated from the Faculty of Law, Thammasat University.

Career 
Rangsiman gained national-level visibility as a political activist in the aftermath of the 2014 Thai coup d'état, and was a member of the New Democracy Movement. He became a member of the Future Forward Party on October 27, 2018, and became a party-list MP following the 2019 Thai general election.

In February 2023, MPs debated the Thai government's performance. On 15 February 2023, during a parliamentary debate regarding the government's performance on tackling illicit drugs and the shadow economy, Rangsiman accused Prayut Chan-o-cha of associating with corrupt figures and neglecting the government's pledge to address drug issues, He implicated senator Upakit Pachariyangkun in a money laundering and drug trafficking case involving Upakit's son-in-law and Tun Min Latt, a Burmese businessman. At a press conference thereafter, Rangsit accused Upakit of falsely declaring his assets before assuming his senate seat in 2019. During the debate, Rangsiman also exposed the issue of corruption within Thai law enforcement agencies in relation to an alleged Chinese triad leader. On February 19, Thai police announced they would press charges against the individual in question, a Chinese national.

See also 

 Move Forward Party

References

External links 

 
 

1992 births
Living people
Rangsiman Rome
Rangsiman Rome
Rangsiman Rome
Rangsiman Rome
Rangsiman Rome
Rangsiman Rome
Rangsiman Rome